The Eighteenth Amendment of the Constitution of India, officially known as The Constitution (Eighteenth Amendment) Act, 1966, amended article 3 of the Constitution in order to clarify the "State" in clauses (a) to (e) of that article (but not in the proviso) include "Union territories". It also added another "Explanation" that the power conferred on Parliament by clause (a) includes the power to form a new State or Union territory by uniting a part of any State or Union territory to any other State or Union territory.

Text

The full text of article 3 of the Constitution, prior to the 18th Amendment, is given below:

Proposal and enactment
The first attempt to amend article 3, in order to clarify the "State" in clauses (a) to (e) of that article (but not in the proviso) include "Union territories", and also to make it clear that power under clause (a) includes the power to form a new State or Union territory by uniting a part of a State or Union territory to another State or Union territory, was through the Constitution (Nineteenth Amendment) Bill, 1966. The bill was introduced in the Lok Sabha on 9 May 1966 by Jaisukh Lal Hathi, then Minister of State in the Ministry of Home Affairs. However, the motion to consider the Bill failed to get the requisite majority on 16 May 1966 and was not carried in the Lok Sabha. The amendments proposed in the Bill were later incorporated in the Constitution (Twentieth Amendment) Bill, 1966. Both bills contained exactly the same text.

The Constitution (Twentieth Amendment) Bill, 1966 (Bill No. 39 of 1966) was introduced in the Lok Sabha on 25 July 1966. It was introduced by C. R. Pattabhi Raman, then Minister of State in the Ministry of Law, and sought to amend article 3 just like the Constitution (Nineteenth Amendment) Bill, 1966. The full text of the Statement of Objects and Reasons appended to the bill is given below:

The bill was debated and passed by the Lok Sabha on 10 August 1966, with only a formal amendment to clause 1, changing the short title to the "Constitution (Eighteenth Amendment) Act". The bill passed by the Lok Sabha, was considered and passed by the Rajya Sabha on 24 August 1966. The bill received assent from then President Zakir Hussain on 27 August 1966, and came into force on the same date. It was notified in The Gazette of India on 29 August 1966.

See also
List of amendments of the Constitution of India

References

18
1966 in India
1966 in law
Indira Gandhi administration